Mount Synge is located on the Continental Divide along border of Alberta and British Columbia. It was named in 1918 after Captain Millington Henry Synge (1823–1907), British Army officer and author.

Climate
Based on the Köppen climate classification, Mt. Synge is located in a subarctic climate zone with cold, snowy winters, and mild summers. Winter temperatures can drop below  with wind chill factors below .

Geology
Like other mountains in Banff Park, Mount Synge is composed of sedimentary rock laid down from the Precambrian to Jurassic periods. Formed in shallow seas, this sedimentary rock was pushed east and over the top of younger rock during the Laramide orogeny.

See also
 List of peaks on the Alberta–British Columbia border
 Mountains of Alberta
 Mountains of British Columbia

References

External links
 Mt. Synge photo: Flickr

Synge
Synge
Synge